, or  is a Buddhist temple in Mii, Ikaruga, Nara, Japan. The temple is located about a kilometer north of Hōryū-ji's Tō-in.

History 
The origin of the temple is not certain, although there are two prevalent theories. The temple was either built in 622 AD by Prince Yamashiro in his wish for his father, Prince Regent Shōtoku, to recover from an illness or in 670 by three monks as part of the reconstruction of Hōryū-ji, which had burned down that same year.

The original date of construction is unclear, while studies so far suggest it was in the seventh century. The temple was a designated national treasure until the last remaining original structure of the complex, the three-story pagoda, was hit by lightning in 1944, and burnt to ground. The current pagoda is a reconstruction from 1975, and holds the original reliquary that was saved from the fire in 1944.

The temple holds six Buddhist statues that are designated important cultural assets. These are open to public as regular exhibits.

Images

See also 
 Hokki-ji
 For an explanation of terms concerning Japanese Buddhism, Japanese Buddhist art, and Japanese Buddhist temple architecture, see the Glossary of Japanese Buddhism.

References
 Pamphlet distributed at Hōrin-ji, obtained April 7, 2007
 Daijirin Japanese dictionary, 3rd edition
 Kōjien Japanese dictionary, 5th edition

External links

Hōrin-ji Homepage (Japanese) 

Buddhist temples in Nara Prefecture
Prince Shōtoku